The Financial Revolution was a set of economic and financial reforms in Britain after the Glorious Revolution in 1688 when William III invaded England. The reforms were based in part on Dutch economic and financial innovations that were brought to England by William III. New institutions were created: a public debt (first government bonds were issued in 1693) and the Bank of England (1694).  Soon thereafter, English joint-stock companies began going public. A central aspect of the financial revolution was the emergence of a stock market.

The elements of the financial revolution rested basically on the  financial techniques developed in the Netherlands: the bill of exchange, both foreign and inland, which as a negotiable instrument became part of the medium of exchange; transferable shares in the permanent capital stock of corporations that were traded in an active secondary market; and perpetual, government-issued annuities (known as Consols). Another piece of Financial Revolution which fundamentally altered the relations between Crown and Parliament was the creation of the Civil List in 1698. This was how Parliament granted the Crown revenues to meet the costs of running the Government and royal establishment. From this point, the Crown was reliant on Parliament's control of revenue for its day-to-day running.

There is a strong connection between the Glorious Revolution, the financial revolution, and Britain’s rise to global power in the eighteenth century. With the creation of a constitutional monarchy, Parliament had to approve any further government borrowing and any new taxes (to cover the costs of borrowing). Because bondholders' interests were hence directly represented in the decision-making process, they could be confident that the risk of default was low. Having such a "credible commitment" to the public debt, Britain could borrow more cheaply (at lower rates of interest) than could absolutist states (such as France) in which bondholders' voices were not represented in government. Scholars debate whether its constitutional structure alone sufficed to make Britain a credible borrower (this argument, made in a very widely cited article by economic historian Douglass North and political scientist Barry Weingast has been challenged by David Stasavage whose analysis emphasizes the importance of party politics).

See also
Military Revolution
Market Revolution

References

1690s in England
 
Financial markets
Glorious Revolution
Revolutions by type
Social history of the United Kingdom